Rudra is a Singaporean band which was formed in 1992. Rudra play a uniquely composed avant garde blend of styles, including, among others, black metal-influenced death metal with interpolations and extended passages of traditional Carnatic music. The lyrical content is derived from Sanskrit Vedic literature and philosophy with, ancient mantras (shlokas) incorporated into the song structures.  The band describes the style as Vedic metal.

History
Rudra was formed in mid-1992 as a trio, then made up of Kathir (bass and vocals), Shiva (drums) and Bala (guitar). It was then known as Rudhra. A fourth member, Selvam, was recruited to supplement Bala on guitar. With this line-up they released a 4-track demo, The Past, in 1994. Prior to this release, Rudhra had been featured in a few underground death metal compilation albums with Singaporean underground metal bands.

In early 1996, the band had a hiatus and the members were involved in separate bands. Towards the end of 1996, Kathir decided to resurrect Rudhra with a slight alteration to its name; thus Rudra (the most common English transliteration for the Sanskrit word) was born. Kathir teamed up with Shiva and started work in the studio, soon to be joined by Bala and Alvin Chua to complete the line up before recording the self-titled debut album in late 1997, which was released in June 1998. The band played a couple of gigs and also starting work on new material. The band replaced its two guitarists with Selvam (ex-member) and Kannan in January 2000.

With that line-up Rudra released its second album, The Aryan Crusade, in September 2001. In January 2002, Big O magazine named this album as one of the top 40 albums of the year. In July 2003, Rudra released a third album Kurukshetra, named after the battlefield featured in the Indian epic the Mahabharata, Kurukshetra.

After touring in Singapore, India, Indonesia and Thailand, Rudra released  Brahmavidya: Primordial I, in April 2005. Brahmavidya: Primordial I represented a slight shift in the band's sound as it exhibits more black metal influences than their previous albums and presents a denser recording that showcases the band's progressive move into more dynamic leads, complex bass-lines, and tighter, faster drumming with a bigger emphasis on blast beats. With this release, Rudra toured the United States in January 2007.

In 2008, Kannan was replaced by Devan. In 2009, Rudra released Brahmavidya: Transcendental I as the second chapter in the Brahmavidya trilogy. They have collaborated with Singapore director Jacen Tan on the music video for Hymns from the Blazing Chariot. In 2009, the band went through another line up change with Vinod replacing longtime member Selvam.

In August 2010, Rudra headlined the first day of Baybeats, an annual 3-day alternative music festival, held in Singapore. This was a rare occurrence: an extreme metal band headlining a non-metal music festival. The band has also invited the interest of musicologists and research papers have been published about both Vedic metal and the band.

In November 2011, Rudra announced that they will be closing the 2011 Brahmavidya Tour by headlining the Strawberry Fields Rock Fest in Bangalore, India. It had been more than 7 years since the band last played Bangalore.

In July 2011, Devan left the band to focus on his personal life. Subash joined the band officially in January 2012 to replace Devan. In 2013, Simon joined the band to replace Subash. In August 2021, Simon had to leave the band due to work commitments. Devan rejoined the band subsequently. Their 10th album (and 9th of all original material) Eight Mahavidyas was released on December 22, 2022.

Discography
The Past (Demo, 1995)
Rudra (1998)
The Aryan Crusade (2001)
Kurukshetra (2003)
Brahmavidya: Primordial I (2005)
Brahmavidya: Transcendental I (2009) (Trinity Recs - Asia, Vic Records - Europe)
Brahmavidya: Immortal I (2011)
RTA (2013)
Kurukshetra (Remastered) (2015)
Enemy of Duality (2016)
The Blackisle Sessions (2018)
Past Life Regression (2018)
Invoking the Gods (2019)
Eight Mahavidyas (2022)

References

External links

Interview

Singaporean heavy metal musical groups
Black metal musical groups
Death metal musical groups
Musical groups established in 1992